Agave decipiens, common names False Sisal or Florida agave, is a plant species endemic to coastal Florida though cultivated as an ornamental in other regions. The species is reported naturalized in Spain, India, Pakistan, and South Africa.

Some authors have suggested that material from Central America and from the Yucatán Peninsula in Mexico might be of the same species as A. decipiens. Gentry and Zona, however, discounted this possibility, regarding this non-Floridian material as A. vivipara (= A. angustifolia)

Agave decipiens grows on hummocks in the Everglades and other marshy areas very close to sea level. It is an arborescent (tree-like) species with a trunk up to 4 m tall, frequently producing suckers (vegetative offshoots). Leaves are frequently 100 cm long, though some of twice that length have been recorded. Leaves have wavy margins with teeth. Flowering stalks are up to 5 m tall, with a large panicle of greenish-yellow flowers. Fruit is a dry capsule up to 5 cm long.

References

decipiens
Endemic flora of Florida
Everglades
Plants described in 1892
Taxa named by John Gilbert Baker